Teslin is the anglicized form of the name of the Deisleen Ḵwáan ("Big Sinew Tribe") of the Tlingit people, one of two ḵwáan that are today incorporated as the Teslin Tlingit Council government in the Yukon Territory of northern Canada.  As a term it may also refer to:

Geography
Teslin Lake, a lake spanning the British Columbia-Yukon border
the Teslin River, a river feeding and draining Teslin Lake
Little Teslin Lake, a lake near the Teslin River in Yukon, Canada
the Teslin Plateau, a landform in the region of Teslin Lake and the Teslin River
Teslin Mountain, a mountain in Yukon, Canada

Settlements
Teslin, Yukon, a village in Yukon, Canada
Teslin Lake, Yukon, an unincorporated area in Yukon, Canada
Teslin River, Yukon, an unincorporated area in Yukon, Canada
Little Teslin Lake, Yukon, an unincorporated area in Yukon, Canada
Teslin Crossing, an unincorporated area in Yukon, Canada
Teslin Lake Indian Reserve No. 7, an Indian Reserve of the Taku River Tlingit government in British Columbia
Teslin Lake Indian Reserve No. 9, an Indian Reserve of the Taku River Tlingit government in British Columbia
Other
Teslin Airport
Teslin Water Aerodrome
Teslin (material)

See also
Teslim